Fombina is a great kingdom in the eastern part of Nigeria (Adamawa state) and northern part of Cameroon (regions of Adamaoua, North, extreme far north) it transcends not just in Nigeria and Cameroun but also some parts of Chad and Central Afrique and it has a ruler bearing the title 'Laamido Fombina' meaning Great King of the south.

Adamawa State
History of Cameroon
History of Nigeria
Countries in precolonial Africa